The Beck Group is a company that provides architecture, construction, real estate development, sustainability, consulting, as well as virtual building and technology services. The company is based in Dallas, Texas and has regional offices in Atlanta, Austin, Carolinas, Denver, Fort Worth, Mexico, Houston, San Antonio, South Florida, and Tampa. The Beck Group serves a diverse range of industries, including corporate, healthcare, entertainment, religious, and education. They also provide services based on the use of their software product, DESTINI.

History
The Beck Group was founded in 1912 by Henry C. Beck in Houston, Texas as a general contractor and moved its headquarters to Dallas in 1924, a requirement for building the city's Cotton Exchange Building.

The majority of their work throughout their history has been commercial, but realized they needed to expand beyond that.
In the 1990s, the construction company began adding other services, such as design and real estate development. It also acquired a UK-developed software product (Reflex) and began to develop a proprietary software, DESTINI, which would provide immediate costs for buildings as they were modeled in the schematic design phase.

In 1999, under the leadership of then-CEO (present executive chairman) Henry C. Beck III, the company merged with Urban Architecture, a regional design firm. In 2013, Fred Perpall took over from Beck III as the fifth CEO of the design-build firm.

The company is headquartered in the Arts District of Downtown Dallas at the former Southwestern Life Insurance Building, designed by George Dahl, but announced a plan to relocate to Thanksgiving Tower in 2019.

Projects
 AT&T Pinnacle Park – Dallas, Texas (Integrated: Architecture, Construction, Development)
 One Atlantic Center – Atlanta, Georgia (Construction)
 Baylor University Sciences Building – Waco, Texas (Integrated: Construction, Development Management)
 Baylor University – Baylor East Village 
 Baylor Research and Innovation Collaborative - Waco, Texas (Construction)
 Crescent Pavilion - Dallas, Texas (Construction)
 Dallas Arboretum - Dallas, Texas (Construction)
 Dickies Arena - Fort Worth, Texas (Construction)
 Disney Corporate Headquarters – Burbank, California (Construction) 
 Duke University Basketball Practice Facility – Durham, North Carolina (Integrated: Architecture, Construction, Programming) 
 The Domain – Austin, Texas (Construction) 
 Fellowship Church - Grapevine, Texas (construction of both the original main facility and the bookstore expansion; in addition, Beck also renovated the facility now hosting its Downtown Dallas campus)
 Fidelity Investments Regional Center – Westlake, Texas (Construction) 
 Firewheel Town Center – Garland, Texas (Integrated: Architect of Record, Construction) 
First National Bank Plaza – Phoenix, Arizona (Construction)
 Fountain Place – Dallas, Texas (Construction) 
 Gateway Church - Southlake main campus (Architect), North Fort Worth site (Architect), and Grand Prairie site (Architect and Construction) 
Guarantee Bank Tower – Phoenix, Arizona (Construction)
 Hunt Corporate Headquarters – Dallas, Texas (Architecture) 
 Los Angeles Museum of Contemporary Art – Los Angeles, California (Construction)
 Mary Kay Headquarters – Dallas, Texas (Construction)
Phoenix Financial Center – Phoenix, Arizona (Construction)
 The Nasher Sculpture Center – Dallas, Texas (Integrated: Associate Architect of Record, Construction) 
 Piano Pavilion at the Kimbell Museum of Art in Fort Worth.
 RadioShack Headquarters – Fort Worth, Texas (Construction) 
 Southlake Town Square – Southlake, Texas (Integrated: Architect of Record, Construction)
 Shake Shack - Dallas, Texas (Integrated: Architect of Record, Construction)
 Texas Motor Speedway – Fort Worth, Texas (Construction) 
 USAA Southeast Regional Office – Tampa, Florida (Construction)
Valley Center – Phoenix, Arizona (Construction)
Van Wezel Performing Arts Hall – Sarasota, Florida (Construction)
 Victory Lofts – Tampa, Florida (Integrated: Architecture, Construction, Development, Media)
 Victory Plaza at Victory Park – Dallas, Texas (Construction)

References

External links
 

Companies based in Dallas
Architecture firms based in Texas
Economy of the Southeastern United States
Economy of the Southwestern United States
Construction and civil engineering companies of the United States
Development software companies
1912 establishments in Texas
Construction and civil engineering companies established in 1912
American companies established in 1912
Engineering companies of the United States